Lactifluus heimii is a species of agaric fungus in the family Russulaceae. It is found in Burundi, where it grows in miombo woodland dominated by Bracystegia utilis.

See also
List of Lactifluus species

References

External links

Fungi described in 1996
Fungi of Africa
heimii